The  by forces of the Japanese feudal domain of Satsuma took place from March to May of 1609, and marked the beginning of the Ryukyu Kingdom's status as a vassal state under the Satsuma domain. The invasion force was met with stiff resistance from the Ryukyuan military on all but one island during the campaign. Ryukyu would remain a vassal state under Satsuma, alongside its already long-established tributary relationship with China, until it was formally annexed by Japan in 1879 as the Okinawa Prefecture.

Etymology 

Background
Satsuma's invasion of Ryukyu was the climax of a long tradition of relations between the kingdom and the Shimazu clan of Satsuma. The two regions had been engaged in trade for at least several centuries and possibly for far longer than that; in addition, Ryukyu at times had paid tribute to the Ashikaga shogunate (1336–1573) of Japan as it did to China since 1372.

In the final decades of the 16th century, the Shimazu clan, along with Toyotomi Hideyoshi, who ruled Japan from 1582 to 1598, requested or demanded various types of aid or service from the kingdom on a number of occasions. King Shō Nei (r. 1587–1620) met some of these demands. Shō Nei sent a tribute ship, the Aya-Bune, to Satsuma in February or March of 1592, and agreed to provide approximately half of his allocated burden in preparation for the invasion of Korea in 1593. However, Shō Nei also ignored many communications from Shimazu and Hideyoshi, which spurred the Shimazu, with the permission of the newly established Tokugawa shogunate (1603–1867), to invade Ryukyu in 1609, claiming it to be a punitive mission.

One of the chief events which spurred Satsuma to aggression occurred when Hideyoshi launched the first of two invasions of Korea. In 1591, Shimazu Yoshihisa said that "Hideyoshi ordered Ryukyu and Satsuma to contribute 15000 troops in order to invade China; however, Ryukyu is a far country and Japanese military strategy is unfamiliar to your forces. I exempt you from mobilization of the troops. In exchange, however, you must supply 10 months' rations for 7000 troops." Sho Nei supplied only half of the demanded amount in 1593.

Following Hideyoshi's death in 1598, and Tokugawa Ieyasu's subsequent rise to power, Shō Nei was asked by Satsuma to formally submit to the new shogunate, a request which was ignored. In 1603, some Ryukyu sailors were cast ashore on the coast of the Sendai domain, and Tokugawa Ieyasu sent them back to Ryukyu. The Shimazu asked Ryukyu to thank Ieyasu again, but Ryukyu ignored the request. The Shimazu then requested to launch a punitive mission against Ryukyu. Approximately 100 ships carrying roughly 3,000 soldiers concentrated at Yamakawa harbor on March 1, 1609. Ichirai Magobee, who was one of them, would write a diary documenting the expedition. The fleet left harbor on March 4, under the command of Kabayama Hisataka and Hirata Masumune.

Campaign

Amami Island
The Satsuma fleet arrived at Amami Ōshima on April 7, where the Amamian people did not resist, but assisted the Satsuma army. Tameten (笠利首里大屋子為転), the chief of Kasari, was a subject of Kabayama, and called on the Amamian people to surrender. Shigetedaru (焼内首里大屋子茂手樽), the chief of Yakiuchi, supplied the Satsuma army. On April 10, Shō Nei was informed of Satsuma's landing on Amami, and he sent Ibun (天龍寺以文長老), the priest of Tenryu temple, to Amami in order to surrender, but Ibun missed the Satsuma army for unknown reasons. On April 16, 13 Satsuma ships then left for Tokunoshima in advance, and the others left Amami at 6am on April 20.

Tokuno Island
On April 17, 13 ships arrived at Tokunoshima and dispersed. Two ships arrived at Kanaguma, but nothing happened. Eight ships arrived at Wanya. The ships were besieged all night by 1,000 people. On April 18, Satsuma troops disembarked, fired into the crowds, and killed 50 people. Three ships arrived at Akitoku, and were attacked at the water's edge by the Akitoku people. However, troops quickly fought back and killed 20–30 people. The Satsuma fleet also arrived at Akitoku at 4pm, April 20. On April 21, Kabayama left for Okierabu Island with 10 ships in advance. Others left Tokunoshima at 10am, April 24, and arrived at Okierabu at sunset. They met Kabayama and his ships there, and quickly departed for Okinawa Island.

Okinawa Island
The Satsuma fleet arrived at Unten harbor on the Motobu Peninsula of Okinawa island on April 25 at 18:00. On April 27, some disembarked. They found Nakijin Castle deserted, and set fires in several places. As soon as Shō Nei heard of Satsuma's arrival at Nakijin, he called Kikuin (菊隠), the zen master, giving him a royal order: "You had lived in Satsuma for several years, so you know three lords of the Shimazu clan very well. Go and make a proposal for peace." Kikuin and his diplomatic mission (Kian was an assistant) left the Ryukyuan royal capital, Shuri at 8am, April 26, and arrived at Kuraha at 12pm. They left Kuraha for Onna by boat. On April 27, they left Onna, and arrived at Nakijin. Kikuin parleyed with Kabayama, who then ordered peace talks at Naha.

In the early morning of April 29, the Satsuma fleet and Kikuin left Unten harbor. They arrived at Ōwan, near Yomitanzan at 6pm. The Ryukyuan Mission left immediately, and arrived at Makiminato at 10pm, where they left their boat, and arrived late at night. Kikuin reported Kabayama's order to Shō Nei, and went down to Naha in the early morning. At Ōwan, Kabayama sent some of his officers to Naha in order to fulfill his promise, while he disembarked his other men, because he heard that there was a chain at the entrance of Naha harbor. "If there is a chain, no ship can enter the harbor." Kabayama and his army then landed at Ōwan, and marched to Shuri.

At 2 PM, May 1, the Satsuma ships entered Naha harbor, and immediately held peace talks at Oyamise (親見世). At that time, there was a fire in Shuri, and Kabayama's force reacted and surged forward. Some Satsuma officers ran up to Shuri from Naha, and calmed down troops. Because Shō Nei gave Kabayama his own brother Shō Ko (尚宏), and all three of his ministers as hostage, Kabayama ordered his men to return to Naha from Shuri, and all of the Satsuma army were there by 4pm, May 1. On May 4, Shō Nei left Shuri Castle, and on May 5, some Satsuma officers entered the castle, and started making an inventory of treasures they found there.

Aftermath

On May 17, Shō Nei departed Unten harbor for Satsuma along with roughly one hundred of his officials. In August, 1610, he met with the retired Shōgun Tokugawa Ieyasu in Sunpu Castle. He was then taken to Edo, for a formal audience with Shōgun Tokugawa Hidetada on August 28. On December 24, he arrived at Kagoshima, where he was forced to formally surrender and to declare a number of oaths to the Shimazu clan. In 1611, two years after the invasion, the king returned to his castle at Shuri. In the king's absence, Kabayama Hisataka and his deputy Honda Chikamasa governed the islands on behalf of their lord Shimazu Tadatsune. 14 samurai officials from Satsuma, along with 163 of their staff, examined the kingdom's political structures and economic productivity, and conducted land surveys of all the islands. Following the king's return to Shuri and the resumption of governance under the royal establishment, some Ryukyuan officials went to Kagoshima as hostages.

The surrender documents signed at Kagoshima in 1611 were accompanied by a series of oaths. The king and his councilors were made to swear that "the islands of Riu Kiu have from ancient times been a feudal dependency of Satsuma", and that there was a long-standing tradition of sending tribute and congratulatory missions on the succession of the Satsuma lords, though these were clearly not true. The oaths also included stipulations that the kingdom admit its culpability in ignoring and rejecting numerous requests for materials and for manpower, that the invasion was justified and deserved, and that the lord of Satsuma was merciful and kind in allowing the king and his officers to return home and to remain in power. Finally, the councilors were forced to swear their allegiance to the Shimazu over their king. Tei Dō, a royal councilor and commander of the kingdom's defense against the invasion, refused to sign the oaths, and was subsequently beheaded.

The Ryukyus remained nominally independent, an "exotic realm" (異国, ikoku) to the Japanese. The kingdom's royal governmental structures also remained intact, along with its royal lineage. However, Amami Ōshima and a number of other northern islands now known as the Satsunan Islands were annexed into Satsuma Domain, and they remain today within Kagoshima Prefecture. Though the king retained considerable powers, he was only permitted to operate within a framework of strict guidelines set down by Satsuma, and was required to pay considerable amounts in tribute to Satsuma on a regular basis. Efforts were also made to obscure Satsuma's domination of Ryukyu from the Chinese Court, in order to ensure the continuation of trade and diplomacy, since China refused to conduct formal relations or trade with Japan at the time.

This framework of guidelines was largely set down by a document sometimes called the Fifteen Injunctions (掟十五ヶ条, Okite jūgo-ka-jō), which accompanied the oaths signed in Kagoshima in 1611, and which detailed political and economic restrictions placed upon the Kingdom. Prohibitions on foreign trade, diplomacy, and travel outside of that officially permitted by Satsuma were among the chief elements of these injunctions. Ryukyu's extensive trade relations with China, Korea, and Southeast Asia were turned to Satsuma's interests, and various laws were put into place forbidding interactions between Japanese and Ryukyuans, and travel between the two island nations. Likewise, travel abroad from Ryukyu in general, and the reception of ships at Ryukyu's harbors, were heavily restricted with exceptions made only for official trade and diplomatic journeys authorized by Satsuma.

Campaign gallery

See also
 Foreign relations of Imperial China

References

Further reading
 The Samurai Capture a King, Okinawa 1609. Author: Stephen Turnbull. Osprey Raid Series #6; Osprey Publishing, 2009. 
琉球大学リポジトリ「喜安日記（伊波本）(Kian diary)」http://ir.lib.u-ryukyu.ac.jp/handle/123456789/10214 
鹿児島県歴史史料センター黎明館編「旧記雑録後編4」鹿児島県,1984年.No.557「琉球渡海日々記(My diary of crossing sea to Ryukyu)」No.659「琉球入ノ記」
鹿児島県歴史史料センター黎明館編「旧記雑録拾遺家わけ2」鹿児島県,1991年.No.640「肝付兼篤書状」
亀井勝信編「奄美大島諸家系譜集」図書刊行会,1980年.
外間守善編「琉球国由来記」角川書店、1997年。No.69「達磨峰西来禅院記」
上原兼善「島津氏の琉球侵略」榕樹書林、2009年。("Ryukyu invasion by Shimazu clan". Author: Uehara Kenzen.)

1609 in Japan
Shimazu clan
Ryukyu
Military of Ryukyu
Ryuku
1609 in military history
Ryukyu